Jean Josipovici (1914–1992) was a French screenwriter and film director. The son of a diplomat, he spent much of his youth in Egypt. He was married to the actress Viviane Romance who he directed in three films. After their divorce, he relocated to Italy.

Selected filmography
 Dorothy Looks for Love (1945)
 Pity for the Vamps (1956)
 Joe Dakota (1971)

References

Bibliography
 Philippe Rège. Encyclopedia of French Film Directors, Volume 1. Scarecrow Press, 2009.

External links

1914 births
1992 deaths
French film directors
20th-century French screenwriters
Film people from Paris
French expatriates in Egypt